Urs Birrer (born 4 September 1961) is a retired Swiss football defender.

References

1961 births
Living people
Swiss men's footballers
FC Luzern players
Swiss Super League players
Association football defenders
Switzerland under-21 international footballers
Switzerland international footballers